The athletics competition at the 1995 European Youth Summer Olympic Days was held from 10 to 13 July. The events took place at the University of Bath, United Kingdom. Boys and girls born 1978 or 1979 or later participated 27 track and field events, divided equally between the sexes with the exception of 3000 metres, 2000 metres steeplechase and pole vault for boys but not girls.

Medal summary

Men

Women

References

Results
1995 European Youth Olympics. World Junior Athletics History. Retrieved on 2014-11-25.
European Youth Olympics. GBR Athletics. Retrieved on 2014-11-25.

1995 European Youth Summer Olympic Days
European Youth Summer Olympic Days
1995
International athletics competitions hosted by England